Mahachulalongkornrajavidyalaya University (MCU) is one of two public Buddhist universities in Thailand, as well as being the oldest Buddhist university in the nation. It has facilities at Wat Mahathat Yuwaratrangsarit in Bangkok and at Wang Noi in Ayutthaya Province.

History 

The university was founded in 1887 by King Chulalongkorn with the purpose of establishing a higher education institute for Buddhist monks, novices, and laypersons with an emphasis on Buddhist studies and other subjects. The university began offering classes in 1889. It adopted its current name in 1896.

By bills passed in 1997, both of Thailand's Buddhist universities —  MCU and Mahamakut Buddhist University — became public universities.

Colleges and faculties 
Mahachulalongkornrajavidyalaya University is organized into several academic units: Faculty of Buddhist Studies, Faculty of Education, Faculty of Humanities, Faculty of Social Sciences, graduate school, and the International Buddhist Studies College.

The faculties offer 26 undergraduate programs, ten master's programs, two doctoral programs, and other academic training. Two of its master's programs, Buddhist studies and philosophy, are internationally oriented and conducted in English. MCU offers a PhD in Buddhist studies (in English).

Campuses 
A new, larger main campus has been built in Wang Noi, Ayutthaya Province, just north of Bangkok. Classes have begun at the new location.

In addition to the main campus, Mahachulalongkornrajavidyalaya University has extension campuses in the following provinces:

 Chiang Mai
 Khon Kaen
 Lamphun
 Loei
 Nong Khai
 Nakhon Phanom
 Nakhon Pathom
 Nakhon Ratchasima
 Nakhon Sawan
 Nakhon Si Thammarat
 Phayao
 Phitsanulok
 Phrae
 Surin
 Ubon Ratchathani

The university hosts the Secretariat for the International Association of Buddhist Universities and is often one of the main organizers for the United Nations Day of Vesak Celebrations.

Affiliation

The university has an affiliated college: Mahapanya Vidayalai at Hat Yai, Songkhla Province.

See also
International Buddhist Studies College

References

External links 
Mahachulalongkornrajavidyalaya University

Buddhism in Thailand
Religion in Bangkok
Buddhist universities and colleges in Thailand
Educational institutions established in 1887
Universities and colleges in Bangkok
1887 establishments in Siam